Thomas Sullivan was a United States Army soldier who was awarded the Medal of Honor for his actions at the Chiricahua Mountains.

Biography
Sullivan was born in 1846 or 1847 in Covington, Kentucky. He enlisted in the 1st Cavalry Regiment of the U.S. Army on June 20, 1868, in Cincinnati, Ohio; his U.S. Army enlistment record reflects an age of 21 (birth year )

Sullivan was discharged for disability on May 27, 1871, at Camp Bidwell, California.

Medal of Honor citation

References

1840s births
United States Army Medal of Honor recipients
People from Covington, Kentucky
United States Army soldiers
American Indian Wars recipients of the Medal of Honor
Year of death unknown